Stageira,  is a Greek village lying on a picturesque plateau on the Chalcidice peninsula, and standing at the foot of the Argirolofos hill. The village stands approximately 8 kilometers south southwest of the ancient Stageira, the birthplace of Aristotle, and a statue of him stands in it.

History
The village of Stageira was built near the archaeological site of Stageira. In Byzantine times, Stageira was called Siderokafsia (which means blast furnace).  The sultan's mint was located there in the 16th century and many ruins of furnaces can be found close to the village. The historical central church of Stageira was built in 1814, a few years before the Greek War of Independence.

Population
The present-day village has approximately 500 inhabitants, but including the neighbouring village of Stratoniki, with which Stageira virtually merges, the population increases to around 1500.

External links
 

Populated places in Chalkidiki